The Journal of Medical Biography is a peer-reviewed academic journal established in 1993 covering the lives of people in or associated with medicine, including medical figures and well-known characters from history and their afflictions. The journal is abstracted and indexed in PubMed, MEDLINE, and Scopus. It was established in 1993 and is published by SAGE Publications on behalf of the Royal Society of Medicine. The current editor-in-chief is Christopher Gardner-Thorpe.

External links
 

Publications established in 1993
Biography journals
General medical journals
SAGE Publishing academic journals
History of medicine journals
Quarterly journals
English-language journals
Academic journals associated with learned and professional societies